Cedric Russell Marshall  (born 15 February 1936), known as Russell Marshall, is a former New Zealand politician of the Labour Party and diplomat.

Biography

Early life and career
Marshall was born in Nelson in 1936. His father Cedric Marshall served as secretary of the Nelson Labour Party, then as its president, and was president of the Nelson Trades Council. Russell is the older brother of Kerry Marshall, a former mayor of both Nelson and Tasman District. He attended Nelson College from 1949 to 1952. He trained as a primary school teacher at Christchurch Teachers' College (1953–54), taught in the Nelson Education Board district in 1955–56, and at Wanganui High School in 1972.  He was a Methodist minister from 1960 to 1972, serving in Spreydon and Halswell, Christchurch (1960–67) and in Masterton (1967–71).

During his time as a Methodist minister Marshall became known as the "Red Reverend" after becoming known for leading protests against the Vietnam War in the 1960s. National Prime Minister Robert Muldoon resurrected the title when Marshall entered politics, frequently referring to him as such in debating exchanges.

Member of Parliament

He represented the Wanganui electorate from 1972 to 1990, when he retired. In his first term in parliament he was on the education select committee where he supported the educational reforms of Phil Amos, the Minister of Education. After the surprise defeat of the Labour government in 1975 Marshall was appointed by leader Bill Rowling as Shadow Minister of Education, a significant promotion for an MP of only three years. He was also Senior Opposition Whip from 1978 to 1980. When Rowling retired in 1983 Marshall stood to replace him as party leader, but was beaten by David Lange.

Marshall was a Cabinet Minister from 1984 to 1990 during the Fourth Labour Government. He was Minister of Education, Minister for the Environment, Minister of Conservation and Minister of Disarmament and Arms Control during the governments first term (1984–87).

As Minister for the Environment Marshall inherited a campaign promise from Labour's previous environment spokesperson Michael Cullen for the wholesale reorganisation of environmental administration. He  merged parts of the Department of Lands and Survey, the Forest Service and Wildlife Service into the new Department of Conservation and additionally established the Ministry for the Environment. As Minister of Education he was involved in reforming the public education system leading to the Tomorrow's Schools report. He also tackled the problem of class sizes setting a goal of recruiting 2,500 new teachers to reduce classes to a maximum of 20 students.

Despite initially intending to retire at the 1987 general election Marshall was persuaded to stand again after a personal plea from Lange. He was returned to cabinet but had a shift of responsibilities, retaining only the Disarmament and Arms Control portfolio and was additionally Minister of Foreign Affairs and Minister of Pacific Island Affairs. He held the foreign affairs portfolio during the Fijian coup d'état in September 1987 and led New Zealand's diplomatic response. He, in conjunction with the Australian government, imposed sanctions on Fiji in response to the coup and racist treatment of the Indo-Fijian populace.

After parliament
He chaired the New Zealand National Commission for UNESCO from 1990 to 1999, represented New Zealand as representative on the UNESCO Executive Board (1995–1999) and Permanent Delegate to UNESCO (1998–2000). He chaired the Finance and Administration Commission of the Executive Board in 1998–1999. He was a member of the Commonwealth Observer Mission to the Lesotho elections in 1993, and chaired the Commonwealth Observer Mission to the Seychelles elections later the same year. He chaired the Commonwealth Observer Mission to South Africa (COMSA) in 1994. From 1994 to 2002 he was chairman of the international education consultancy PINZ (Polytehnics International New Zealand) and Education New Zealand from 1998 to 2002. He was High Commissioner to the United Kingdom and Nigeria and Ambassador to Ireland (2002–2005).

He finally completed his BA degree at the Victoria University of Wellington and graduated in 1993. In 1994 he was elected to the Council of Victoria University, becoming Pro Chancellor (1999) and Chancellor (2000–2002). In 2000–2001 he chaired the Tertiary Education Advisory Commission and was later Chairman of the Tertiary Education Commission (2005–2007). In July 2007 he was elected president of the New Zealand Institute of International Affairs, a position from which he retired in 2011. He currently chairs the Advisory Board of Gbool (recruiting students from Arabic speaking countries) and is a member of the Mana Education Centre Trust in Porirua.

Local-body candidate
Marshall stood as a candidate in the Porirua City Council elections in 1992 but was unsuccessful. In 2010 he stood again but this time for Mayor of Porirua but was placed 5th out of nine candidates with only 1,263 votes. The successful candidate was Nick Leggett.

Honours
Marshall was awarded the Queen Elizabeth II Silver Jubilee Medal in 1977, and the New Zealand 1990 Commemoration Medal in 1990. In the 2001 New Year Honours, Marshall was appointed a Companion of the New Zealand Order of Merit, for public services.

In 1989 he was awarded an honorary doctorate from the Khon Kaen University in Thailand for services to community development.

Personal life
Marshall married Barbara May Watson at St John's Methodist Church in Nelson in 1961. They had three children together. His brother, Kerry Marshall, married Barbara's sister, Colleen Watson.

Notes

References

|-

|-

1936 births
Living people
Methodist ministers
New Zealand Methodists
New Zealand Labour Party MPs
Members of the Cabinet of New Zealand
New Zealand education ministers
New Zealand foreign ministers
Members of the New Zealand House of Representatives
New Zealand MPs for North Island electorates
Companions of the New Zealand Order of Merit
Administrators of Tokelau
Permanent Delegates of New Zealand to UNESCO
High Commissioners of New Zealand to the United Kingdom
Ambassadors of New Zealand to Ireland
High Commissioners of New Zealand to Nigeria
People educated at Nelson College